Imelda Hobbins is a former camogie player, captain of the All Ireland Camogie Championship winning team in 1996, the first for Galway at senior level.

Early career
She won an All Ireland minor medal with Galway in 1986, captained the Cyril Farrell trained St Raphael’s, Loughrea team to the 1988 All-Ireland schools championship, scoring 1-10 in the final against FCJ Bunclody, and scored two goals as Galway beat Limerick 3-4 to 1–5 in the 1988 All Ireland junior final. She won another All-Ireland schools championship in 1989

Inter-county
She was a member of the 1994 National League winning team and the 1998 Galway team beaten by Cork in the All Ireland final.

References

External links
 Camogie.ie Official Camogie Association Website
 Wikipedia List of Camogie players

Year of birth missing (living people)
Living people
Galway camogie players